"I Can't Stop Thinking About You" is a song by English singer-songwriter Sting from his twelfth studio album, 57th & 9th. It was released as the album's lead single on 1 September 2016. The song peaked at number two on Billboard's Adult Alternative Songs chart in the United States, becoming Sting's first hit on the chart since 2004's "Stolen Car (Take Me Dancing)", which reached number 14.

Promotion
Sting debuted the studio version of "I Can't Stop Thinking About You" – and performed the song live – on 31 August 2016 in the Red Bull Sound Space at L.A. radio station KROQ.

On 27 October 2016, Sting released for free on YouTube an acoustic version of "I Can't Stop Thinking About You".

Charts

Release history

References

2016 singles
2016 songs
Sting (musician) songs
Songs written by Sting (musician)
A&M Records singles